Tuanku Antah ibni Almarhum Yamtuan Radin (1812–1888) was the sixth Yamtuan Besar of Negri Sembilan. He ruled from 1869 to 1888, and tried to keep Negri Sembilan independent from British rule. His son Tuanku Muhammad Shah succeeded him and modernised his state.

Early life

Tuanku Antah was the son of the late Yamtuan Radin, the Yang di-Pertuan Besar of Negeri Sembilan from 1824 to 1861, and of his consort, Tuanku Ampuan Intan Tunku Alang Husain.

One of his wives whom he married was Cik Puan Wan Siti binti Haji Doraman in which they lived at the Kampung Tanjung Jati, Kuala Pilah. They had issued 2 sons Tunku Putra Sulaiman Ibni Tuanku Antah and Tunku Laksamana Abdul Kahar Tuanku Antah.

History

Sungai Ujong

His struggle against the British began in March 1872 when Datuk Kelana Syed Abdul Rahman, who governed Sungai Ujong (modern-day Seremban) allowed the British to open a tin mine and set up their operations within his domain. With the help of British soldiers, he defeated his enemy Datuk Bandar Tunggal and burned Rahang.

As the appointment of a foreigner, Resident PJ Murray, into Datuk Kelana's court was seen by other local officials as an invitation of a British invasion, the officials crowned Tuanku Antah as the Yamtuan of Seri Menanti, who did not recognise Datuk Kelana's authority.

Datuk Kelana claimed Terachi as part of his territory in 1875, causing Tuanku Antah to get angry. He dismissed the local government there that supported Datuk Kelana. Resident PR Murray interpreted this as a breach against Datuk Kelana's administration, so he went to Terachi with 20 soldiers led by Lieutenant Hinxman, and an interpreter and doctor from Australia known as Dominic Daly to investigate, but they did not find any sign of disorder there. PR Murray returned to Sungai Ujong, but Daly travelled from Kampung Terachi to Kuala Pilah to measure their distances. Daly was turned away when his party stumbled unto 200 men who threatened them to leave, and requested PR Murray to help him.

Battle of Bukit Putus

Tuanku Antah mobilised 4000 soldiers in preparation for the oncoming British invasion, and was helped by several others: Datuk Siamang Gagap, the Tunku Besar of Tampin, and the people of Rembau, Jelebu, and Johol. His army marched into Bukit Putus and Paroi, where he warned PJ Murray not to interfere with his sovereignty by trespassing into Terachi. The British Resident then requested help from the Straits Settlements, who sent 20 soldiers led by Lieutenant Peyton from Melaka, while Lieutenant Hinxman and his troops immediately dug trenches and fortified their compound, due to uprisings. Lieutenant Hinxman also brought another army with him, consisting of 30 troops, 30 policemen, and 6 Arabs, to attack Tuanku Antah at Paroi, but they were outnumbered by the locals, who surrounded and defeated them, while Tuanku Antah's forces occupied a house along the banks of the Linggi River as their base of operations.

On 5 December 1875, the British used Datuk Kelana's cannons to fight against Tuanku Antah. After a one-hour-long shootout, Lieutenants Hinxman and Peyton advanced through a swamp to destroy Tuanku Antah's fort, but they were not able to find him, and Tunku Laksamana took his place to govern Seri Menanti.

Reinforced by 350 soldiers led by Governor Anson from Pulau Pinang, the British bombarded Tuanku Antah's fortress. Tuanku Antah was forced to retreat, and the British retook Paroi. With the arrival of the battleship HMS Thistle to Sungai Ujong, still more reinforcements arrived under Lieutenant Colonel Clay, who led his group of 280 soldiers to retake Bukit Sungai Ujong. He later led his troops through Langkap into Bukit Putus, where his forces defeated more of Tuanku Antah's soldiers, and advanced on to Seri Menanti. Notified of the British approaching to his capital, Tuanku Antah fled with his family to Johor, where they came into the protection of Sultan Abu Bakar.

Sultan Abu Bakar then advised him to make peace with the British. In May 1876, Tuanku Antah arranged a meeting with the four Undang-Undang of Negeri Sembilan between them and William Jervouis, the Governor of Singapore. Under a peace treaty between all the belligerents, the British agreed to allow Tuanku Antah to rule Seri Menanti, Johol, Ulu Muar, Jempol, Terachi, Gunung Pasir, and Innas, and renamed his title Yang Di Pertuan Seri Menanti while the other regions of Negeri Sembilan will continue to be ruled by their respective leaders, and Sungai Ujong remains under British rule.

Death

After two years of retreat into Johor, Tuanku Antah returned to Seri Menanti, where he lived there for eleven years. He died in 1888, and was buried at the Seri Menanti Royal Mausoleum.

References

History of Negeri Sembilan
Royal House of Negeri Sembilan
Yang di-Pertuan Besar of Negeri Sembilan
Minangkabau people
Malaysian people of Minangkabau descent
1812 births
1888 deaths
19th-century monarchs in Asia